The watt-hour per kilogram (SI symbol: W⋅h/kg) is a unit of specific energy commonly used to measure the density of energy in batteries and capacitors.

SI Units

In the SI system of measurement, one watt-hour per kilogram is equal to 3600 joules per kilogram.

Typical values
The batteries that Tesla uses in their electric cars deliver about 254 W⋅h/kg, compared to supercapacitors that are typically rated between 3–10 W⋅h/kg, with the best commercially available supercapacitors as high as 47 W⋅h/kg.

Nuclear batteries based on betavoltaics can reach up to 3300 W⋅h/kg, although over much longer time periods.

References 

Units of energy
Mass